Marek Gancarczyk  (born February 19, 1983 in Grodków) is a retired Polish footballer who played as a midfielder.

Career

Club
In a past he was player of MKS Oława and Górnik Polkowice.

Family
His brother is Janusz Gancarczyk, who plays for Zagłębie Lubin.

External links
 

1983 births
Living people
Polish footballers
Polish expatriate footballers
Górnik Polkowice players
Śląsk Wrocław players
ŁKS Łódź players
SSV Markranstädt players
Chojniczanka Chojnice players
Miedź Legnica players
Odra Opole players
Ekstraklasa players
People from Grodków
Sportspeople from Opole Voivodeship
Association football midfielders
Polish expatriate sportspeople in Germany
Expatriate footballers in Germany